The Eighth Avenue Historic District is located in Fort Worth, Texas. It was added to the National Register on November 26, 2006.

Photo gallery

See also
 Historic preservation
 National Register of Historic Places listings in Tarrant County, Texas
 Recorded Texas Historic Landmarks in Tarrant County

References

External links
 
 
 
 

National Register of Historic Places in Fort Worth, Texas
Historic districts in Fort Worth, Texas
Historic districts on the National Register of Historic Places in Texas